Monument to the Soviet War Veterans is a monument located on the Avala mountain near Belgrade, Serbia. It is dedicated to members of the Soviet military delegation who were killed in an airplane crash on the Avala on October 19, 1964. The delegation was flying to Belgrade to attend the celebration of the 20th anniversary of the Liberation of Belgrade on October 20, 1944, since Red Army forces had taken part in the liberation. In the plane crash, Marshal Sergey Semyonovich Biryuzov and general Vladimir Ivanovich Zhdanov were notably killed, among others.

Monument was sculptured by Jovan Kratohvil.

See also
Monument to the Unknown Hero
Avala TV Tower

Monuments and memorials in Serbia
Serbian military monuments and memorials
Buildings and structures completed in 1964